The 1906–07 Irish Cup was the 27th edition of the premier knock-out cup competition in Irish football. 

Cliftonville won the tournament for the 6th time, defeating Shelbourne 1–0 in the final replay, after a 0–0 draw in the original final.

Results

First round

|}

Quarter-finals

|}

Semi-finals

|}

Replay

|}

Final

Replay

References

External links
 Northern Ireland Cup Finals. Rec.Sport.Soccer Statistics Foundation (RSSSF)

Irish Cup seasons
1906–07 domestic association football cups
1906–07 in Irish association football